Kavi Kalash (died March 1689 CE, Tulapur) was a poet, a close friend and helper to Maratha king (Chatrapati) Sambhaji who reigned 1680–1689.

Early life 
A Kanyakubja Brahmin by birth,  Kalash dev was an able administrator as well as a warrior, who accompanied Chatrapati Sambhaji Maharaj in many of his campaigns. He is known to have defeated Shahabuddin Khan in a fierce battle near Raigad in 1684. He was given the title of Chandogamatya by Sambhaji. He was born in Unnao district and was instrumental in Agra escape plan .

Death 
In March 1689, Kavi Kalash was captured, along with King Sambhaji, by the Mughal army under Aurangzeb in Sangameshwar, and was tortured to convert to Islam and to influence Sambhaji maharaj to do the same. It is said that Aurangzeb got down from the throne to pray and thank Allah for the victory on seeing captured Sambhaji maharaj. Taking that opportunity Kavi Kalash, who was also captured, made an instant poetry:

यावन रावन की सभा संभू बंन्ध्यो बजरंग।

लहू लसत सिंदूर सम खूब खेल्यो रनरंग॥

ज्यो रबि छबि लखतही नथीत होत बदरंग।

त्यो तव तेज निहारके तखत त्यजो अवरंग॥

which translates to:

Sambhaji (maharaj) has been tied like Hanuman in the court of Islami ravan (i.e., Aurangzeb)

Maharaj looking red because of wounds and blood from the great war he fought

The way fireflies lose their glow after sunrise,

Seeing your effulgence, Aurangzeb (also lost his glow and) gave up his thrown.

Listening to the poem, enraged Aurangzeb ordered Kavi Kalash's tongue be cut/plucked. Eventually Sambhaji Maharaj and Kavi Kalash were paraded as clowns and, according to some accounts, killed using tiger claws for a slow death. He was given a jagir of three villages near pune which was upgraded to 18 villages in Bundelkhand by Peshwa NanaSaheb .

References

People of the Maratha Empire
People executed by the Mughal Empire
1689 deaths
Year of birth missing
Executed Indian people
17th-century executions in India